Leptogenys falcigera, is a species of ant of the subfamily Ponerinae.

Distribution
Comoros, Guam, Hawaii, Marshall Islands, Micronesia, Palau, Philippines, Madagascar, Mauritius, Sri Lanka.

References

Animaldiversity.org
Itis.org
Images at Wikimedia

External links

 at antwiki.org
AntKey

Ponerinae
Hymenoptera of Asia
Insects described in 1861